, better known as , is a Japanese actor and voice actor from Ōsaka Prefecture.

He is a graduate of Ryukoku University. He was affiliated with The Bungaku Company before transferring to Theatre Company Subaru. Now retired from acting, he currently works as a Buddhist monk.

Roles

Television drama
Tenkagomen (Junan Nakagawa)

Television animation
Lupin III: Steal Napoleon's Dictionary! (Robert Hawk)
Madō King Granzort (Headman Dolby)
Manga Nihon Emaki (Masako Hōjō)
Mashin Hero Wataru 2 (Elfan, Doc Hottoitē, Daibutatta)
Nobody's Boy: Remi (Pierre Acquan)

OVA
Record of Lodoss War (Firumā)

Dubbing roles

Live action
Born on the Fourth of July (VHS edition) (Legion Commander (Ed Lauter), Marine Major (John Getz))
Die Hard 2 (General Ramon Esperanza (Franco Nero))
Ghost (Subway Ghost (Vincent Schiavelli))
The Guns of Navarone (Fuji TV edition) (Howard Barnsby)
The Hunt for Red October (Dr. Jeffrey Pelt (Richard Jordan))
Jaws (TBS edition) (Mayor Larry Vaughn)
Miracle on 34th Street (Fred Gailey)
Navy SEALs (Video edition) (Ben Shaheed)
The NeverEnding Story (Cairon (Moses Gunn))
Star Trek: The Next Generation (Jean-Luc Picard (first voice) (Patrick Stewart))
Star Trek V: The Final Frontier (Laserdisc and common DVD editions) (John Talbot)
Star Trek VI: The Undiscovered Country (Laserdisc and common DVD editions) (Spock)
Tucker: The Man and His Dream (Abe Karatz (Martin Landau))

Animation
Alice in Wonderland (Carpentor)
DuckTales (Pony Canyon edition) (Scrooge McDuck)
Dumbo (Straw Hat Crow)
Fun and Fancy Free (Pony Canyon edition) (Mortimer Snerd)
Mickey's Christmas Carol (Pony Canyon edition) (Scrooge McDuck)
Robin Hood (Pony Canyon edition) (Little John)
The Sword in the Stone (Pony Canyon edition) (Sir Ector)
Thunderbirds Are Go (VHS edition) (Captain Paul Travers)
The Many Adventures of Winnie the Pooh (Pony Canyon edition) (Gopher)
Song of the South (Pony Canyon edition) (Br'er Turtle)

References

External links
Ultra series profile

Yoshimizu, Kei
Yoshimizu, Kei
Yoshimizu, Kei
Yoshimizu, Kei
Yoshimizu, Kei